The Order of Ernst August was founded 15 December 1865 by King George V of Hanover in memory of his father Ernest Augustus, King of Hanover. The order was awarded for both civil and military merit. It was divided in five classes:

Grand Cross
Grand Commander
Commander
Officer
Knight

History

In 1866, the Kingdom of Hanover was defeated and annexed by the Kingdom of Prussia at the end of the Austro-Prussian War. As a result, Prussia dissolved the three Hanoverian orders of knighthood. George V and his successors still continued to award the Order of Ernst August, but now as a House Order, in the same manner of many non-regnant royal houses. Between 1865 and 1900, forty two Grand Crosses were granted. Most of them after the royal family's expulsion from Hanover in 1866. Seventeen Hanoverian and twenty five foreign Grand Crosses are recorded.

Insignia

The medal is a gold Maltese cross, enamelled white, with small gold ball on eight points and four royal crowns in the corners. At the center is a medallion of red enamel with the monogram of Ernest Augustus (EA), and around, there was a band of blue enamel with the motto of the order "SUSCIPERE ET FINIRE" in gold. The back displays the founding date "DEC MDCCCLXV XV" with the initials of the king who had granted the order George V ("G").

The ribbon is scarlet red with two dark blue stripes parallel to each side.

References

Orders of chivalry of Germany
Orders, decorations, and medals of Hanover
1865 establishments in the Kingdom of Hanover